The 2011 Ulster Senior Football Championship was the 123rd installment of the annual Ulster Senior Football Championship held under the auspices of the Ulster GAA. It was won by Donegal who defeated Derry in the final. It was their first Ulster title since 1992. The winning Donegal team received the Anglo-Celt Cup, and automatically advanced to the quarter-final stage of the 2011 All-Ireland Senior Football Championship.

Donegal's semi-final defeat of Tyrone and Derry's semi-final defeat of Armagh brought about the end of a long period of dominance by these two counties. Armagh and Tyrone had shared the previous eleven Ulster senior titles between them in a run stretching back to 1999. It also brought a first major trophy for Jim McGuinness's famed Donegal team, who would go on to consign the decade-long dominance of those two counties to history.

Bracket

Preliminary round

Quarter-finals

Semi-finals

Final

References

External links
Ulster GAA website

2U
Gaelic
Ulster Senior Football Championship